Talpaki is a rural locality (a settlement) in Gvardeysky District of Kaliningrad Oblast, Russia.

European route E77 passes through it.

Rural localities in Kaliningrad Oblast